Colostethus thorntoni is a species of frog in the family Dendrobatidae. It is endemic to Colombia where it is known from the Cordillera Central in the Antioquia Department.

Its natural habitat is sub-Andean forest. Little is known about its ecology.

References

thorntoni
Amphibians of Colombia
Endemic fauna of Colombia
Taxa named by Doris Mable Cochran
Amphibians described in 1970
Taxonomy articles created by Polbot